Cholicheh (also Romanized as Cholīcheh and Chelīcheh; also known as Chelaw Chāh, Chelecheh, and Chelow Chāh) is a city in Junqan District of Farsan County, Chaharmahal and Bakhtiari province, Iran. At the 2006 census, its population was 4,656 in 1,109 households, when it was a village in the Central District. The following census in 2011 counted 4,993 people in 1,352 households, when the village was in the newly formed Junqan District. The latest census in 2016 showed a population of 4,945 people in 1,413 households, by which time it had been raised to the status of a city. The city is populated by Lurs.

References 

Farsan County

Cities in Chaharmahal and Bakhtiari Province

Populated places in Chaharmahal and Bakhtiari Province

Populated places in Farsan County

Luri settlements in Chaharmahal and Bakhtiari Province